Julliard Frans (born March 18, 1987), known professionally as Hef, is a Dutch rapper.

Career 
Julliard Frans was born in Rotterdam and is of Curaçaoan and Surinamese descent. He is a brother of fellow rappers Adje and Crooks. He grew up in the borough Hoogvliet in Rotterdam, which he considered a problem neighbourhood. During his childhood, his parents sold drugs while he was playing with his toys next to them. He eventually began selling drugs himself and began stealing goods, such as scooters and bicycles. He has left the offenses behind him and began focusing on music. In 2008, he gained attention for his rap songs about street life in Hoogvliet, when he released the single "Puur". The same year he released the mixtape Boyz in de hood vol. 1  with his brothers Adje and Crooks, for which they won a State Award.

In 2009, he released the mixtape Hefvermogen, which was re-released by the label Noah's Ark as his debut album in 2010. The album contained the tracks "Overal", "Gone" featuring Major and "Op een missie".

Discography 
Studio albums
Hefvermogen (2009) 
Papierwerk (2012)
13 (2015)
Ruman (2016)
Geit (2017)
Koud (2019)
Tranen (2019)
Rook (2020)
Hefvermogen 2 (2022)

References

1987 births
Living people
Dutch rappers
Dutch people of Curaçao descent
Dutch people of Surinamese descent
Musicians from Rotterdam